Gentianaceae is a family of flowering plants of 103 genera and about 1600 species.

Etymology
The family takes its name from the genus Gentiana, named after the Illyrian king Gentius.

Distribution
Distribution is cosmopolitan.

Characteristics
The family consists of trees, shrubs and herbs showing a wide range of colours and floral patterns. Flowers are actinomorphic and bisexual with fused sepals and petals. The stamens are attached to the inside of the petals (epipetalous) and alternate with the corolla lobes. There is a glandular disk at the base of the gynoecium, and flowers have parietal placentation. The inflorescence is cymose, with simple or complex cymes. The fruits are dehiscent septicidal capsules splitting into two halves, rarely some species have a berry. Seeds are small with copiously oily endosperms and a straight embryo. The habit varies from small trees, pachycaul shrubs to (usually) herbs, with ascending, erect or twining stems. Plants are usually rhizomatous. Leaves opposite, less often alternate or in some species whorled, simple in shape, with entire edges and bases connately attached to the stem. Stipules are absent. Plants usually accumulate bitter iridoid substances; bicollateral bundles are present. Ecologically, partial myco-heterotrophy is common among species in this family with a few genera such as Voyria and Voyriella lacking chlorophyll and being fully myco-heterotrophic.

Ecology
Some of these plants have limited ranges and are protected under governmental oversight. For example, Gentianella uliginosa (Dune Gentian), which occurs in some limited areas of Wales and Scotland, is a priority species under the Biodiversity Action Plan of the United Kingdom.

Biogeographic history
Gentianaceae are distributed worldwide, but most species occur in temperate zones. According to Merckx et al., the neotropics were an important area for the early diversification events in Gentianaceae, most of which occurring during the Eocene. However, Pirie et al. suggested that ancient vicariance cannot be ruled out as an explanation for the early origins of Exaceae across Africa, Madagascar and the Indian subcontinent unless a strong assumption is made about the maximum age of Gentianales.

Uses
Economically, some species are cultivated ornamental plants and many species yield bitter principles used medicinally and in flavorings.

Taxonomy
The family was described for the first time by Antoine Laurent de Jussieu in 1789.

Tribes
tribe Chironieae (G.Don) Endl.
subtribe Canscorinae Thiv & Kadereit
subtribe Chironiinae G.Don
subtribe Coutoubeinae G.Don
tribe Exaceae Colla
tribe Gentianeae Colla
subtribe Gentianinae G.Don
subtribe Swertiinae (Griseb.) Rchb.
tribe Helieae Gilg
tribe Potalieae Rchb.
subtribe Faroinae Struwe & V.A.Albert
subtribe Lisianthiinae G.Don
subtribe Potaliinae (Mart.) Progel
tribe Saccifolieae (Maguire & Pires) Struwe, Thiv, V.A.Albert & Kadereit
incertae sedis Voyria

Genera

Adenolisianthus 
Anthocleista 
Aripuana 
Bartonia 
Bisgoeppertia 
Blackstonia 
Calolisianthus 
Canscora 
Celiantha 
Centaurium 
Chelonanthus 
Chironia 
Chorisepalum 
Cicendia 
Comastoma 
Congolanthus 
Coutoubea 
Cracosna 
Crawfurdia 
Curtia 
Cyrtophyllum 
Deianira 
Djaloniella 
Duplipetala 
Enicostema 
Eustoma 
Exaculum 
Exacum 
Exochaenium 
Fagraea 
Faroa 
Frasera 
Geniostemon 
Gentiana 
Gentianella 
Gentianopsis 
Gentianothamnus 
Gyrandra 
Halenia 
Helia 
Hockinia 
Hoppea 
Irlbachia 
Ixanthus 
Jaeschkea 
Karina 
Klackenbergia 
Kuepferia 
Lagenanthus 
Lagenias 
Latouchea 
Lehmanniella 
Limahlania 
Lisianthius 
Lomatogoniopsis 
Lomatogonium 
Macrocarpaea 
Megacodon 
Metagentiana 
Microrphium 
Neblinantha 
Neurotheca 
Obolaria 
Oreonesion 
Ornichia 
Orphium 
Phyllocyclus 
Picrophloeus 
Potalia 
Prepusa 
Pterygocalyx 
Purdieanthus 
Pycnosphaera 
Rogersonanthus 
Roraimaea 
Sabatia 
Saccifolium 
Schenkia 
Schinziella 
Schultesia 
Sebaea 
Senaea 
Sinogentiana 
Sinoswertia 
Sipapoantha 
Swertia 
Symbolanthus 
Symphyllophyton 
Tachia 
Tachiadenus 
Tapeinostemon 
Tetrapollinia 
Tripterospermum 
Urogentias 
Utania 
Veratrilla 
Voyria 
Voyriella 
Xestaea 
Yanomamua 
Zeltnera 
Zonanthus 
Zygostigma

Phylogeny

References

External links

Gentian Research Network

 
Asterid families